Marcianne Mukamurenzi (born 11 November 1959) is a Rwandan former long-distance runner. She won gold and bronze medals in 10,000 metres at the 1988 and 1989 African Championships in Athletics. She also competed for Rwanda in the 1984, 1988 and 1992 Summer Olympics, never progressing to the finals. She was the first woman to represent Rwanda at the Olympics. In 1991 she set the current Rwandan record in women's 3000 metres with the time of 8:59.90.

Achievements

References

External links

1959 births
Living people
Rwandan female long-distance runners
Rwandan female marathon runners
Olympic athletes of Rwanda
Athletes (track and field) at the 1984 Summer Olympics
Athletes (track and field) at the 1988 Summer Olympics
Athletes (track and field) at the 1992 Summer Olympics
World Athletics Championships athletes for Rwanda
African Games silver medalists for Rwanda
African Games medalists in athletics (track and field)
Athletes (track and field) at the 1987 All-Africa Games